Charles Donnelly may refer to:

Charles Donnelly (poet) (1914–1937), Irish poet and political activist
Charles Donnelly (railroad) (1869–1939), president of Northern Pacific Railway, 1920–1939
Charles L. Donnelly, Jr. (1929–1994), United States Air Force general
Charley Donnelly, Maryland Agricultural College football coach